Digvijaya is a 1987 Indian Kannada film,  directed by  Somu and produced by Geetha Srinath, Somu, and M. S. Karanth. The film stars Ambareesh, Srinath, Shankar Nag, and Ambika. The film has a musical score by Hamsalekha.

Cast

Ambareesh
Srinath
Shankar Nag
Ambika
Radha in Special Appearance
Vajramuni
N. S. Rao
C. R. Simha
Sudheer
Dheerendra Gopal
Sundar Krishna Urs
Sundar Raj
Negro Johnny
M. S. Karanth
Ramesh Bhat
Somu
Umashree
Jyothi
Shanthamma
Shyamala
Swarnamma
V. Ramachandra
M. Ranga
Police Mahadevaiah
Thipatur Siddaramaiah
Lakshman
Seetharam
Ravi
Master Chethan
Baby Sangeetha
Archana
Seema
Y. R. Ashwath Narayana Rao
Mandeep Roy

References

External links
 

1987 films
1980s Kannada-language films